Ídolos Brazil 4 (also known as Ídolos 2009) was the fourth season of Brazilian reality interactive talent show Ídolos (second aired on Rede Record), which premiered August 18, 2009 with the season finale airing on December 16, 2009.

Rodrigo Faro returned as a host from last year and the judging panel again consists of Luís Calainho, Paula Lima and Marco Camargo.

Saulo Roston won the competition with Diego Moraes as the first runner-up and Hélen Lyu finishing third.

Early process

Regional auditions 
Auditions were held in the following cities:

During this stage guest judges filled in a special fourth judging seat.

Theater Round

Chorus Line 
The first day of Theater Week featured the eighty-six contestants from the auditions round. Divided into groups, the contestants go up on stage and individually sing a song a capella. Sixty-seven advanced.

Groups 
The sixty-seven remaining contestants were divided in groups of four or three. They had to pick a song and sing accompanied by a soundtrack. Forty-eight advanced.

Solos 
The forty-eight remaining contestants had to choose a music and singing accompanied by a band and can also play an instrument. The contestants were divided into three rooms: square, circle and triangle. The twelve contestants on the square room were eliminated, while the twelve contestants on the circle room advanced to the semifinals.

Final Cut 
The twenty-four remaining contestants who were in the triangle room knew that had not been defined a unanimous verdict for them. In the end, the judges take the contestants in pairs and tell them if they made the final twenty-four.

Semi-finals 
The twenty-four semifinalists were split by gender into two groups. Each contestant would then sing in their respective group's night. The top six contestants from each group made it to the finals. The guys performed on September 29, 2009 and the girls on October 7, 2009, with results show on the following night.

Finals

Finalists

Elimination chart

Results Night Performances

References

External links 
 Ídolos Brazil website

Ídolos (Brazilian TV series)
2009 Brazilian television seasons